Dobravac (1280) or Dobravec (Добравец) was a Serbian nobleman serving in the crown land of Hum, with the title of tepčija. He is mentioned in a document dated 1280 as serving the countess of Hum. He had a clerk or assistant, Mojše, who sold two of his bondmaids in Ragusa (Dubrovnik) that year. Although Dobravac's jurisdiction is unknown from the quotation, he was not a veliki tepčija (serving the king directly); his office was limited to the Hum land, but his type of work was the same as that of the veliki tepčija. The tepčija had executive authorities; his otroci ( otrok), were servants, lesser in rank but not slaves.

Annotations
The name is an old Serbian name, found in medieval epigraphy.

References

Sources

13th-century Serbian nobility
People of the Kingdom of Serbia (medieval)
13th-century births
13th-century deaths
Tepčija